Đurađ Đurašević Crnojević (1413–1435) was the lord of Paštrovići (a coastal tribe) of the Lordship of Zeta and a voivode of the Serbian Despotate, alongside his younger brother Aleksa (Lješ).

Đurađ and his brother Aleksa (Lješ) were lords of the territory of Paštrovići (Luštica and hills above Kotor and Budva) during the reign of Balša III. The Đurašević family was a branch of the Kalođurđević family. Its members held the most distinct positions in the court of Balša III. Đurađ was the head of the family. Đurađ was one of the witnesses listed in the charter issued by Balša III when he founded a church of the Praskvica Monastery in 1413. Đurađ's son and Aleksa Paštrović, an envoy of Sandalj Hranić, were also present. Đurašević was elected as a witness and maybe the executor of the charter of Balša III because at that time he ruled over Paštrovići, Luštica and the hills above Kotor and Budva.

After the death of Balša III they refused Venetian invitations to switch sides and to accept Venetian suzerainty remaining loyal to the new lord of Zeta, Serbian Despot Stefan Lazarević. They controlled 10 salt ponds in Grbalj valley near Kotor. Đurađ and his brother Aleksa built the Kom Monastery in the period between 1415 and 1427, when Upper Zeta was held by the Crnojevići.

On 10 March 1420 Venetians promised to appoint Đurađ and his brother Aleksa (Lješ) as governors of Budva.

Đurađ Đurašević was a member of the Crnojević noble family. He had four sons: Đurašin Đurašević, Gojčin Crnojević, Stefan (Stefanica) Crnojević and fourth son with unknown name and historical role.

References

Sources 
 
 

15th-century Serbian nobility
Lords of Zeta
Crnojević noble family
People of the Serbian Despotate
15th-century deaths
Bay of Kotor
Year of birth unknown